The New Zealand two-dollar note was a banknote of the New Zealand dollar in circulation from 1967 until 1991

The note introduced on 10 July 1967, replacing the £1 note. The note was withdrawn from circulation along with the one-dollar note in 1991, as one-dollar and two-dollar coins had commenced production the previous year.

The New Zealand two-dollar note featured Queen Elizabeth II on the obverse and a Rifleman bird as well as Mistletoe on the reverse.

References

Banknotes of New Zealand
1991 disestablishments in New Zealand
1967 establishments in New Zealand
Two-base-unit banknotes